Mabrey is a surname. Notable people with the surname include:

Freight Mabrey (born 1963), American podcast personality 
Marina Mabrey (born 1996), American basketball player
Sunny Mabrey (born 1975), American actress and model
Vicki Mabrey (born 1956), American television correspondent